Aureocramboides mopsos is a moth in the family Crambidae. It was described by Graziano Bassi in 1991. It is found in the Democratic Republic of the Congo.

References

Crambinae
Moths described in 1991
Moths of Africa